Mamit is a census town in Mamit district in the Indian state of Mizoram. Mamit emerged from the regrouping of villages.

Geography
It has an average elevation of 718 metres (2355 feet).

Demographics
As of 2011 India census, Mamit had a population of 7884, in which 4074 are male while 3810 are female. Mamit has an average literacy rate of 95.40%, higher than the national average of 74.04%: male literacy is 95.86%, and female literacy is 94.92%. In Mamit, 15% of the population is under 6 years of age. The population comprises Mizo, Reang (Bru),Chakma and other backward classes.

Transport
Mamit is linked with state capital Aizawl and with state of Tripura by NH 108. The distance between Mamit and Aizawl is 89 km and is connected with regular service of Bus, Jeeps and Sumo (Sport utility vehicle).

Education 
There is one college Mamit College, under Mizoram University and a number of public and private schools.

Media
The Major Newspapers in Mamit are:
Mamit Times

References

 
Cities and towns in Mamit district